The Constitution of Seychelles is the governing document of the Republic of Seychelles.

18 June, the anniversary of its ratification, is celebrated in Seychelles as "Constitution Day".

History 

Following a successful referendum on 26 March 1979, a new constitution for the country went into effect. This constitution made Seychelles a one-party state with the sole candidate for president nominated by the ruling party.

Towards the end of 1991, Seychelles began a process to become a multi-party democracy. Discussions and public debates between the major political parties (namely the Seychelles People's Progressive Front and Seychelles Democratic Party) began to take place in January 1993. Following a referendum which took place on 18 June 1993, the current constitution of Seychelles was approved.

References

Further reading

External links 
 
 Constitution of Seychelles (with 2011 amendments)
 Constitution de la République des Seychelles 

Politics of Seychelles
Seychelles